Just Louis Fontaine (18 August 19331 March 2023) was a French professional footballer who played as a striker. He scored the most goals ever in a single edition of the FIFA World Cup, with thirteen in six matches in the 1958 world cup tournament. In March 2004, Pelé named him one of the 125 Greatest Living Footballers at a FIFA Awards Ceremony.

Football career
Born in Marrakech, French Morocco, to a French father and a Spanish mother, Fontaine moved to Casablanca, where he attended the Lycée Lyautey.

Fontaine began his amateur career at USM Casablanca, where he played from 1950 to 1953. Nice recruited him in 1953, and he went on to score 44 goals in three seasons for the club. In 1956, he moved to Stade de Reims, where he teamed up with Raymond Kopa from the 1959–60 season. Fontaine scored 121 goals in six seasons at Stade de Reims. In total, Fontaine scored 165 goals in 200 matches in the Ligue 1, and won the championship twice, one time in 1958, and the other in 1960. He also took part in the team that got to the 1958–59 European Cup final against Real Madrid, being that season's top scorer with ten goals.

Wearing the blue shirt of France, Fontaine has an even more impressive record. On his debut on 17 December 1953, Fontaine scored a hat trick as France defeated Luxembourg 8–0. In seven years, he scored 30 goals in 21 matches. However, he will best be remembered for his 1958 FIFA World Cup performance, where he scored 13 goals in just six matches – a feat that included putting four past defending champions West Germany. It is also the highest number of goals ever scored by one player at a single World Cup tournament.  This tally secured him the Golden Boot. , he is tied with Lionel Messi as the fourth-top scorer in FIFA World Cup history, with each of the three ahead of him - Gerd Müller (14 goals), Ronaldo (15 goals) and Miroslav Klose (16 goals) - having played in at least two tournaments.

Fontaine played his last match in July 1962, being forced to retire early (28 years and 11 months old) because of a recurring leg injury. He briefly managed the France national team in 1967, but was replaced after only two friendly games, which ended in defeats. As coach of Morocco, he led the Atlas Lions to 3rd in the 1980 African Cup of Nations, overseeing the emergence of such players as Badou Zaki, Mohammed Timoumi and Aziz Bouderbala. Morocco reached the final stage of 1982 World Cup qualifying but were beaten by Cameroon. As sporting director of Paris Saint-Germain F.C., he managed to take the club to help promote the club to the first division.

After retirement
Fontaine was named by Pelé as one of the 125 greatest living footballers in March 2004. He was chosen as the best French player of the last 50 years by the French Football Federation in the UEFA Jubilee Awards in November 2003. With Eugène N'Jo Léa he founded the National Union of Professional Football Players in 1961. He criticized the performance of the French team in the 2010 World Cup in South Africa, particularly on the lackluster play of the forwards. Fontaine died in Toulouse, where he had lived for 60 years, on 1 March 2023 at the age of 89.

Career statistics

Club

International

Scores and results list France's goal tally first, score column indicates score after each Fontaine goal

Honours
Nice
 French Division 1: 1955–56
 Coupe de France: 1953–54

Reims
 French Division 1: 1957–58, 1959–60, 1961–62
 Coupe de France: 1957–58
 Trophée des Champions: 1958, 1960
 European Cup: runner-up 1958–59

France
 FIFA World Cup third place: 1958

Individual
 Ballon d'Or third-place: 1958
 Golden Foot: 2003, as a football legend
 FIFA World Cup Golden Boot: 1958
 French Division top scorer: 1959–60
 European Cup top scorer: 1958–59
 FIFA 100: 2004

References and notes

External links
 UEFA.com – France's Golden Player
 Profile on French federation official site
 

1933 births
2023 deaths
Sportspeople from Marrakesh
French footballers
Association football forwards
OGC Nice players
Stade de Reims players
Ligue 1 players
France international footballers
1958 FIFA World Cup players
UEFA Golden Players
UEFA Champions League top scorers
FIFA 100
French football managers
France national football team managers
Paris Saint-Germain F.C. managers
Toulouse FC managers
Morocco national football team managers
Ligue 2 managers
Ligue 1 managers
French expatriate football managers
Expatriate football managers in Morocco
French expatriate sportspeople in Morocco
Officiers of the Légion d'honneur
French people of Spanish descent